The Office of the Prime Minister and Privy Council  building, formerly known as the Langevin Block, is an office building facing Parliament Hill in Ottawa, Ontario, Canada.  As the home of the Privy Council Office and Office of the Prime Minister, it is the working headquarters of the executive branch of the Canadian government.

The term Langevin Block was previously used as a metonym for the Prime Minister's Office and the Privy Council Office. The building was named after Father of Confederation and cabinet minister Hector-Louis Langevin. Following objections by Indigenous people of the use of Hector Langevin's name, due to allegations regarding Langevin's role in establishing the residential school system associated with the abuse of Indigenous children and attempts to forcibly assimilate them, Prime Minister Justin Trudeau announced the renaming of the building on June 21, 2017.

The building is a National Historic Site of Canada.

Overview 

While the offices of senior Privy Council Office officials remain in the building, its use is now largely limited to the Prime Minister's Office, in addition to his or her office in the Centre Block of the Parliament Buildings.

Started in 1884 and completed in 1889, the building was the first federal government office building constructed outside the Parliament Hill precinct. It is built of sandstone obtained from a New Brunswick quarry owned by Charles Elijah Fish. It occupies a prominent place on Ottawa's Wellington Street, adjacent to the National War Memorial, Chateau Laurier, Government Conference Centre, Rideau Canal, National Arts Centre, High Commission of the United Kingdom in Ottawa, and the Sparks Street Mall. Originally named the Southwest Departmental Building during construction, its name from completion until 2017 came from Sir Hector-Louis Langevin, the Public Works Minister in the Cabinet of Sir John A. Macdonald.

The structure is distinctive in Ottawa for its Second Empire Style design because most government buildings from the period were built in the Gothic Revival style. It was designed by the Chief Dominion Architect Thomas Fuller, who also designed the original Parliament Buildings. In 2000, it was named by the Royal Architectural Institute of Canada as one of the top 500 buildings produced in Canada during the last millennium. The building is connected by a bridge to an office building at 13 Metcalfe Street.

In 2017, the Assembly of First Nations called for the building to be renamed, largely based on allegations of Hector Langevin's supposed role in the creation of Canada's controversial Indian residential schools system. On June 21, 2017 the building was renamed the Office of the Prime Minister and Privy Council.

The Prime Minister's Office 
The Prime Minister of Canada has two office rooms.

See also
 List of designated heritage properties in Ottawa

References

Additional Reading

External links 
 The Langevin Block from Yesterday to Today 
 Office of the Prime Minister and Privy Council Canada's Historic Places

1889 establishments in Ontario
Federal government buildings in Ottawa
Second Empire architecture in Canada
National Historic Sites in Ontario
Buildings and structures on the National Historic Sites of Canada register
Government buildings completed in 1889
Sandstone buildings in Canada
Thomas Fuller buildings
Designated heritage properties in Ottawa
Classified Federal Heritage Building